Buday Dénes (Denes von Buday) was a Hungarian composer, born in Budapest. He was a well known composer of both poems and music for films made between 1930 and 1950. Buday studied at the Academy of Music, which is today known as the Franz Liszt Academy of Music, where his teacher, Hans von Koessler, held his lectures in German.

Work

Opera 
Buday's only opera, the comedy Loreley, premiered in 1919 in Vienna.

Operettas 
Buday authored many operettas and musical comedies, which were shown on stage between 1916 and 1947.

Movie composer

References

Book Reference

External links 
  by Gyula Juhász; the composer is singing and playing the piano
  ≈I love you Ágnes with János Sárdy
  ≈Hearth could not pour forth with Janka Sólyom

Hungarian film score composers
Male film score composers
1890 births
1963 deaths
Franz Liszt Academy of Music alumni
Musicians from Budapest
Hungarian pianists
20th-century composers
Male pianists
20th-century Hungarian male musicians